The 1965 Soviet Chess Championship was the 33rd edition of USSR Chess Championship. Held from 24 November 1965 to 24 December 1965 in Tallinn. The tournament was won by Leonid Stein. The final were preceded by semifinals events at Leningrad and Omsk.

Table and results

References 

USSR Chess Championships
Championship
Chess
1965 in chess
Chess